Wesley Memorial Methodist Episcopal Church (Wesley United Methodist Church) is a historic church at 800 Howard Street in Greenwood, Mississippi.

It was built in 1921 and added to the National Register in 1985.

References

Churches on the National Register of Historic Places in Mississippi
Gothic Revival church buildings in Mississippi
Churches completed in 1921
National Register of Historic Places in Leflore County, Mississippi
1921 establishments in Mississippi
Methodist churches in Mississippi